Google Play Newsstand was a news aggregator and digital newsstand service by Google. On May 8, 2018, Google announced at Google I/O that Google Play Newsstand was being amalgamated with Google News. Launched in November 2013 through the merger of Google Play Magazines and Google Currents, the service let users subscribe to magazines (in select countries) and topical news feeds, receiving new issues and updates automatically. Content was offered for reading on a dedicated Newsstand section of the Google Play website or through the mobile apps for Android and iOS. Offline download and reading is supported on the mobile apps.

For publishers, Google offers a variety of tools for customization and optimization of their content, as well as the option to include ads through the use of DoubleClick for Publishers. Publishers can restrict geographic access to their content, and employ Google Analytics for aggregated readership data. Publishers can also offer discounts for Google Play subscriptions if a user is already a subscriber on another platform, such as print or digital.

History 
Google Play Newsstand was launched on Android on November 20, 2013, through the merger of Google Play Magazines and Google Currents into a single service. The Google Currents app on the iOS platform was redesigned and renamed to Google Play Newsstand on September 23, 2014. A web application for Newsstand was launched on November 16, 2016.

The service has seen two major redesigns since its launch in 2013. The first, in October 2014, added elements from the "Material Design" design language for the release of Android Lollipop. The second, in November 2016, coincided with the launch of the website, and added machine learning technologies to better personalize the content to each individual user, including improved news recommendation, and expanded support for interactive, rich media.
On May 15, 2018, Google Play Newsstand, along with Google News and Weather were replaced with Google News, although it wasn't until November 5 that it was phased out completely, removing the Newsstand tab from the Google Play website and the Play Store app. Then in January 2020, magazines were no longer available on Google News, ending all traces of Play Newsstand altogether,

Features 
Users can subscribe to digital magazines to receive new issues or access to content on an ongoing basis; but, since the replacement of Newsstand with News, users have posted hundreds of negative comments about the change - ranging from the failure to access paid for magazine subscriptions to felling as if they were being force fed topics which were not relevant to them.  Many there have been experiencing hundreds of derogatory comments posted by users on News . Subscriptions renew automatically, with the user charged at the start of each subscription period. Users are notified of price increases. Google states that existing subscribers of a print publication may be eligible for a free digital subscription.

When users purchase a single issue of a magazine, Google claims that it "won't ask for your name, email address, or mailing address. We may anonymously share your postal/ZIP code with the magazine's publisher." If a user becomes a magazine subscriber, "a publisher will receive your name, address, and email address. A publisher may also receive your reading history in the relevant publication. The publisher may use these in accordance with the publisher's privacy policy."

Some magazines offer a trial period.

Users can also subscribe to topical feeds of interest, with the service surfacing news sources that interest the user.

Google Play Newsstand supports PDF and RePub file formats for magazine content, and RSS feeds for news content.

Platforms 
On computers, content can be read on a dedicated Google Play Newsstand section on the Google Play website.

On smartphones and tablets, content can be read on the Google Play Newsstand mobile app for the Android and iOS operating systems.

Offline download and reading is supported on the mobile apps.

Newsstand Producer 
Google Play Newsstand Producer (formerly Google Currents Producer) is a production environment for content publishers to include their website or blog on Newsstand. It enables publishers to customize the look and feel of their content, and make design decisions that automatically optimize the content so that it can be simultaneously delivered to smartphones and tablets of all sizes and orientations.

Publishers can include ads within articles using Google's DoubleClick for Publishers.

By default, magazines are available to readers worldwide. Publishers can restrict access by either allowing or blocking specific countries. Publishers can also set the primary language for an edition and choose whether they will allow automatic translation.

Publishers can use Google Analytics to analyze aggregated readership data for their content.

Publishers can offer discounts for subscriptions on Google Play Newsstand for users who have an existing print or digital subscription for the content. Google will verify the user's existing subscription before providing a discounted price.

Geographic availability 

The basic Newsstand service, with topical feeds, is available worldwide. Paid Newsstand content is available in over 35 countries. The full country list includes: Argentina, Australia, Austria, Bahrain, Belgium, Brazil, Canada, Chile, Colombia, Egypt, France, Germany, India, Indonesia, Ireland, Italy, Japan, Jordan, Kuwait, Lebanon, Malaysia, Mexico, Netherlands, Oman, Peru, Philippines, Poland, Qatar, Russia, Saudi Arabia, Spain, Taiwan, Thailand, Turkey, Ukraine, United Arab Emirates, United Kingdom, and United States.

History of expansion 
Availability of paid content was introduced in Italy in April 2014, in France and Germany in May 2014, in India, the Netherlands, Russia and Spain in September 2014, in Brazil, Indonesia, Mexico and South Korea in December 2014, in Austria, Belgium, Ireland, and Turkey in March 2015, and in Malaysia and Thailand in September 2015.

See also 
Apple Newsstand
Google News & Weather
Digital edition
Electronic publishing
Online magazine

References 

Play Newsstand
Android (operating system) software
IOS software